Parliamentary elections were held in the Socialist Republic of Macedonia on 11 November 1990, with a second round on 25 November. They were the first competitive elections in the country's history. VMRO-DPMNE emerged as the largest party, winning 38 of the 120 seats.

Electoral system
The 120 members of the Assembly were elected in 120 single-member constituencies. If no candidate received over 50% in the first round, a second round was held and contested by every candidate who received over 7% of the vote in the first round. In the second round a majority was not required, and the candidate who received the most votes won the seat.

Results

A total of 113,051 voters in the first round were not on the voter roll, but voted using their ID cards.

References

Macedonia
Elections in North Macedonia
November 1990 events in Europe